The 2013 Kansas State Wildcats football team represented Kansas State University in the 2013 NCAA Division I FBS football season.  The Wildcats play their home games at Bill Snyder Family Football Stadium, in Manhattan, Kansas as they have since 1968. 2013 is the 118th season in school history.  The Wildcats are led by head coach Bill Snyder in his 22nd overall and fifth straight season since taking over in his second tenure in 2009.  K-State is a member of the Big 12 Conference. Conference play began with a loss to the Texas Longhorns, which ended the Wildcats 5-game winning streak against the Longhorns.  Their last lost against Texas was in 2003.  The regular season ended with a win over in-state rival Kansas in the Sunflower Showdown. After completing the regular season with a 7–5 record, the Kansas State Wildcats returned for a bowl game for the fourth straight year, were selected to play in the 2013 Buffalo Wild Wings Bowl and played the Michigan Wolverines. The season ended with the Wildcats defeating the Wolverines, 31–14, to break a five-game bowl losing streak winning their first bowl game since the 2002 Holiday Bowl and finishing the season 8–5.

Off-season
The off-season saw the completion of the West Stadium Center of Bill Snyder Family Football Stadium.

Scholarship recruits

Schedule

Game summaries

North Dakota State

The Wildcats were favored by 11 going into the game.  The game was debut of K-State's brand new West Stadium Center, a brand new press box and luxury suite building, and featuring a statue of head coach Bill Snyder, replacing the old structure built in 1993.  The Bison spoiled the opening game of the Wildcats' season, which featured a pre-game ceremony of raising the 2012 Big 12 Conference Champions flag.  North Dakota State, trailing 21–17 in the middle of the fourth quarter, made an eight-minute touchdown drive to go up by 2 points with just 28 seconds remaining.  New K-State quarterback Jake Waters threw an interception on the Wildcats' first play of the possession, sealing the victory for the two-time defending FCS champions.

North Dakota State went on to finish the season undefeated with a record of 15–0 and won their third consecutive FCS Championship.

Louisiana–Lafayette

The Wildcats were favored by 10 going into the game. Kansas State scored 10 points in each of the first two quarters while giving up just 3 points in the half. Tramaine Thompason returned the opening kickoff of the second half 94 yards for a touchdown. Moments later, Thompson returned a Louisiana–Lafayette punt 79 yards to the Rajin' Cajun 2-yard line. Following a Jake Waters 1-yard touchdown run, Louisiana–Lafayette returned the ensuing kickoff 100 yards for a touchdown.  In the fourth quarter K-State's Ty Zimmerman returned an interception 32 yards for a touchdown after the ball deflected off of a Rajin' Cajun player's helmet.  K-State was able to score on offense, defense, and special teams in the second half alone. K-State leads the nation for most non-offense touchdowns since 1999.

UMass

The Wildcats were favored by 38 1/2 going into the game.

Texas

The Longhorns were favored by 5 going into the game.

Oklahoma State

The Cowboys were favored by 11 1/2 going into the game.

Baylor

The Bears were favored by 17 1/2 going to the game.

West Virginia

The Wildcats were favored by 11 1/2 going into the game.

Iowa State

The Wildcats were favored by 17 going into the game.

Texas Tech

The Red Raiders were favored by 11 going into the game.

TCU

The Wildcats were favored by 11 going into the game.

Oklahoma

K-State was favored by 4 going into the game.

Kansas

Michigan (2013 Buffalo Wild Wings Bowl)

Sources:

K-State was favored by 7 going into the game.
Kansas State played the Michigan Wolverines on December 28, 2013 at Sun Devil Stadium in Tempe, Arizona for the 2013 Buffalo Wild Wings Bowl.

Kansas State scored first with a touchdown pass from Jake Waters to Tyler Lockett in the first quarter and K-State's kicker Ian Patterson made good on the extra point to take the lead 7–0.  Kansas State maintained the lead for the remainder of the game.  At halftime, Kansas State led 21–6 with Tyler Lockett receiving three touchdown passes from Jake Waters and Michigan succeeding with two field goals.  After no score in the third quarter, Michigan's Fitzgerald Toussaint ran the ball three yards for a touchdown while Kansas State's Patterson made a field goal and John Hubert ran in a touchdown for 1 yard.

Kansas State won the game by a score of 31–14.  Many sportswriters determined that Kansas State controlled the Michigan team through the entire game and one wrote "Kansas State dominates Michigan in Buffalo Wild Wings Bowl" to summarize the results.  Another wrote that "K-State could be a 2014 Big 12 title contender" after the results of the game.  Supporters of Michigan used the results to highlight high hopes for the upcoming seasons with comments such as "The young guys are the bright spot for this team."

Kansas State's Tyler Lockett was named the offensive MVP.  Lockett finished the game with ten catches for 116 yards and three touchdowns to tie the Bowl record.  Kansas State safety Dante Barnett was awarded the Defensive MVP. Barnett recorded a team-high eight tackles and an interception with a 51-yard return to the Michigan seven-yard line.

Kansas State Quarterback Jake Waters was named the overall Most Valuable Player of the game.

Statistics

Rankings

Roster

Coaching staff
The following is a list of coaches at Kansas State for the 2013 season.

References

Kansas State
Kansas State Wildcats football seasons
Guaranteed Rate Bowl champion seasons
Kansas State Wildcats football